The Fallen Curtain is a collection of 11 short stories by British writer Ruth Rendell. The title story won the MWA Edgar Award for Best Short Story of the Year in 1975. The book was first published in the UK in 1976 by Hutchinson. All stories – with the exception of People Don’t Do Such Things, The Vinegar Mother and Divided We Stand – were first published in Ellery Queen's Mystery Magazine in the early to mid-1970's.

Contents 
 The Fallen Curtain
 People Don’t Do Such Things
 A Bad Heart (in the magazine publication under the title Trapped)
 You Can’t Be Too Careful
 The Double (in the magazine publication under the title Meeting in the Park)
 The Venus Fly Trap (in the magazine publication under the title Venus’s Flytrap)
 The Clinging Woman (in some publications under the title His Worst Enemy)
 The Vinegar Mother
 The Fall of a Coin
 Almost Human
 Divided We Stand

References

External links 
 The Fallen Curtain, And Other Stories. Goodreads.

Short story collections by Ruth Rendell
Hutchinson (publisher) books
Crime short story collections
1976 short story collections